Jöns Jacob Berzelius was a Swedish chemist.

Berzelius may also refer to:
Berzelius (secret society), a secret society at Yale University
Berzelius (crater), a lunar crater
13109 Berzelius, a Main-Belt minor planet